Bill Harney may refer to:
 William Edward Harney (1895–1962), Australian bushman and author
 Bill Yidumduma Harney (born 1931), Wardaman elder, astronomer, artist, and author, biological son of William Edward Harney